Bhattiprolu is a village in Guntur district of the Indian state of Andhra Pradesh. It is the headquarters of Bhattiprolu mandal in Tenali revenue division. The Buddhist stupa in the village is one of the centrally protected monuments of national importance. One of the earliest evidence of Brahmi script in South India comes from Bhattiprolu. The script was written on an urn containing Buddha's relics. The script has been named Bhattiprolu script

History 
The original name of Bhattiprolu was Pratipalapura, a flourishing town in the ancient Sala kingdom that predated Andhra Satavahanas. From available inscriptional evidence, King Kuberaka was ruling over Bhattiprolu around 230 BCE. Bhattiprolu is well known for its Buddha stupa (Vikramarka kota dibba) built about 3rd-2nd century BCE.

The stupa and the script 

Three mounds were discovered in Bhattiprolu in 1870. In 1892 when excavations were undertaken by Alexander Rea, three inscribed stone relic caskets containing crystal caskets, relics of Buddha and jewels were found. The stupa was found to be 40 meters in diameter with an additional basement of 2.4 meters wide running all around. The most significant discovery is the crystal relic casket of Sarira Dhatu of the Buddha from the central mass of the stupas. The Mahachaitya (great stupa) remains of a large pillared hall, a large group of ruined votive stupas with several images of Buddha, a stone receptacle containing copper vessel, which in turn, contained two more, a silver casket and within it, a gold casket enclosing beads of bone and crystal were found.

One of the earliest evidence of Brahmi script in South India comes from Bhattiprolu. The script was written on an urn containing Buddha's relics. The script has been named Bhattiprolu script.

The Bhattiprolu script is related to the Tamil-Brahmi, and is found in nine early inscriptions on stupa relic caskets discovered at Bhattiprolu (Andhra Pradesh). According to Richard Salomon, the Bhattiprolu script reflects innovations in a Dravidian language context, rather than Indo-Aryan languages. Both the Bhattiprolu and Tamil Brahmi share common modifications to represent Dravidian languages. The Bhattiprolu was likely a provincial offshoot of early southern Brahmi script, states Salomon.

"A Manual of the Krishna District in the Presidency of Madras" (1883) mentions Public Works Department at that time having demolished beautiful marble pillars, central casket and used the remains in the sluice flowing 2 miles east of Bhattiprolu. Bhattiprolu Union Panchayat was established in 1892 under Madras local boards act.

Geography 

Government and politics 

Bhattiprolu gram panchayat is the local self-government of the village. The village forms a part of Andhra Pradesh Capital Region and is under the jurisdiction of APCRDA.

Transport 

The village has connectivity with National Highway 216 (India) which passes through the village. APSRTC operates buses from Tenali and Repalle via Bhattiprolu. Bhattiprolu railway station is located on Tenali–Repalle branch line and administered under Guntur railway division of South Central Railway zone.

Education 

As per the school information report for the academic year 2018–19, the village has a total of 14 schools. These include 4 MPP, one other type and 9 private schools.

See also 
List of villages in Guntur district
Bhattiprolu alphabet

References 

Villages in Guntur district
Mandal headquarters in Guntur district
Buddhist sites in Andhra Pradesh
Indian Buddhist sculpture
Buddhist pilgrimage sites in India
Tourist attractions in Guntur district
Archaeological sites in Andhra Pradesh
Ancient Indian cities
Hindu holy cities
Former capital cities in India